Polistes jokahamae  is a species of paper wasp from Japan.

References

External links
 
 

jokahamae
Insects described in 1887